Drasteria picta is a moth of the family Erebidae first described by Hugo Theodor Christoph in 1877. It is found in Ukraine, Russia, Kazakhstan, southern Turkey, Syria, Armenia, Daghestan, Kyrgyzstan, Uzbekistan, Turkmenistan, Mongolia and China (Tibet, Qinghai).

The wingspan is 33–34 mm. Adults have been recorded on wing from April to July.

Subspecies
Drasteria picta picta
Drasteria picta radapicata (Staudinger, 1901)

References

Drasteria
Moths described in 1877
Moths of Asia